The Kutub al-Sittah are six (originally five) books containing collections of hadith (sayings or acts of the Islamic prophet Muhammad) compiled by six Sunni Muslim scholars in the ninth century CE, approximately two centuries after the death of Muhammad. They are sometimes referred to as al-Sihah al-Sittah, which translates as "The Authentic Six". They were first formally grouped and defined by Ibn al-Qaisarani in the 11th century, who added Sunan ibn Majah to the list. Since then, they have enjoyed near-universal acceptance as part of the official canon of Sunni Islam.

Not all Sunni Muslim jurisprudence scholars agree on the addition of Ibn Majah. In particular, the Malikis and Ibn al-Athir consider al-Muwatta' to be the sixth book. The reason for the addition of Ibn Majah's Sunan is that it contains many Hadiths which do not figure in the other five, whereas all the Hadiths in the Muwatta' figure in the other Sahih books.

Significance 
Sunni Muslims view the six major hadith collections as their most important, though the order of authenticity varies between Madhhabs:

 Sahih Bukhari, collected by Imam Bukhari (d. 256 AH, 870 CE), includes 7,563 ahadith (including repetitions, around 2,600 without repetitions)
 Sahih Muslim, collected by Muslim b. al-Hajjaj (d. 261 AH, 875 CE), includes 7,500 ahadith (including repetitions, around 3,033 without repetitions)
 Sunan al-Sughra, collected by al-Nasa'i (d. 303 AH, 915 CE), includes 5,270 ahadith (including repetitions)
 Sunan Abu Dawood, collected by Abu Dawood (d. 275 AH, 888 CE), includes 5,274 ahadith (including repetitions)
 Jami al-Tirmidhi, collected by al-Tirmidhi (d. 279 AH, 892 CE), includes 4,400 ahadith (including repetitions, only 83 are repeated)
 Sunan ibn Majah, collected by Ibn Majah (d. 273 AH, 887 CE), includes 4,341 ahadith (including repetitions)

The first two, commonly referred to as the Two Sahihs as an indication of their authenticity, contain approximately seven thousand hadiths altogether if repetitions are not counted, according to Ibn Hajar.

Authors 
The authors of the six collections are as follows:

Muhammad b. Isma'il al-Bukhari, the author of the Sahih Bukhari, which he composed over a period of sixteen years. Traditional sources quote Bukhari as saying that he did not record any hadith before performing ablution and praying. Bukhari died near Samarqand in 256/869–70
Muslim b. Hajjaj al-Naishapuri, who died in Nishapur in 261/874–5 and whose Sahih Muslim is second in authenticity only to that of Bukhari. Some Muslim hadith scholars rate the authenticity of Sahih Muslim more than Sahih Bukhari
Abu Dawood Sulaiman b. Ash'ath al-Sijistani, a Persian but of Arab descent, who died in 275/888–9.
Muhammad b. 'Isa al-Tirmidhi, the author of the well-known as Sunan al-Tirmidhi, who was a student of Bukhari and died in 279/892–3.
Abu 'Abd al-Rahman al-Nasa'i, who was from Khurasan and died in 303/915–16.
Ibn Majah al-Qazwini, who died in 273/886–7.

See also
Alqamah ibn Waqqas

References

Notes 
 Sahih Bukhari and Sahih Muslim contain many of the same Hadith with different chains, and Bukhari in particular also simply repeats the same Hadith with the same chain in multiple chapters. There is disagreement on the amount of unique hadith in the collections due to the disagreements over what Hadith to include as a repeat (chain/text variations) and whether to include same chain repeats in the total number etc.

Citations

Sources 

 A comprehensive Biography of Imam Malik

Hadith collections
Sunni literature